Brilliant Marriage is a 1936 American drama film directed by Phil Rosen and starring Joan Marsh,  Ray Walker and Inez Courtney.

Cast
 Joan Marsh as Madge Allison  
 Ray Walker as Garry Dane  
 Inez Courtney as Sally Patrick  
 Hugh Marlowe as Richard G. Taylor, III  
 Doris Lloyd as Mrs. Madeleine Allison  
 Ann Codee as Yvette Duval  
 Olive Tell as Mrs. Jane Taylor  
 Holmes Herbert as Mr. Rodney Allison  
 Robert Adair as Thorne, the Butler  
 Barbara Bedford as Brenda  
 Dick Elliott as Editor  
 Herbert Ashley as Captain  
 Kathryn Sheldon as Ellen, the Maid  
 Victor Wong as Wong  
 George Cleveland as Bartender  
 Lynton Brent as Blaine

References

Bibliography
 Michael R. Pitts. Poverty Row Studios, 1929-1940: An Illustrated History of 55 Independent Film Companies, with a Filmography for Each. McFarland & Company, 2005.

External links
 

1936 films
1936 drama films
American drama films
Films directed by Phil Rosen
Films based on works by Ursula Parrott
American black-and-white films
1930s English-language films
1930s American films
English-language drama films